S41 and S42 operate a circular service on the Ringbahn and are part of the  Berlin S-Bahn. The S41 operates clockwise around the circle, the S42 operates counter-clockwise.

See also
Line S4

References

Berlin S-Bahn lines

de:Berliner Ringbahn#S-Bahn